Global Wars UK is an annual professional wrestling supershow co-produced by the Japanese New Japan Pro-Wrestling (NJPW) and British Revolution Pro Wrestling (RPW) promotions. The two promotions established a partnership in July 2015 as part of NJPW's "New IWGP Conception." All editions of the show have been archived on New Japan's NJPW World streaming service.

Events

2015

2016

Night 1

Night 2

2017

Night 1

Night 2

2018

See also

Professional wrestling in the United Kingdom
List of professional wrestling promotions in Europe

References

External links
Official New Japan Pro-Wrestling website (English)
Official Revolution Pro Wrestling website

Revolution Pro Wrestling
New Japan Pro-Wrestling shows
2015 establishments in the United Kingdom
2018 disestablishments in the United Kingdom
Recurring events established in 2015
Professional wrestling in England
Annual events in the United Kingdom